Sumida (written:  or ) is a Japanese surname. Notable people with the surname include:

Daizo Sumida (住田 代蔵, 1887–1961), Japanese businessman
, Japanese cyclist
, Japanese women's footballer
, Japanese swimmer
, Japanese footballer

Japanese-language surnames